Cool World is a 1992 American live-action/animated black comedy fantasy film directed by Ralph Bakshi and written by Michael Grais and Mark Victor. Starring Kim Basinger, Gabriel Byrne and Brad Pitt, it tells the story of a cartoonist who finds himself in the animated world he thinks he created, but has existed long before. In this world, he is seduced by one of the characters, a femme fatale who wants to become human.

Following the success of Who Framed Roger Rabbit (1988) and his own professional resurgence in television in the late 1980s, Bakshi conceived the film as a live-action/animated horror film. He brought the idea to Paramount Pictures, and became attached to direct; it was his first feature film in nearly a decade. The film was intended as his comeback, however, interference from producer Frank Mancuso Jr. led to an extensive rewrite from Michael Grais, Mark Victor, and an uncredited Larry Gross. As a result, relations between Bakshi, Mancuso, and the studio deteriorated, and the film had a highly tumultuous production, with a lot of tensions and disagreements.

Cool World was released by Paramount on July 10, 1992. Upon its release, the film was a critical and commercial failure. Critics panned the film for its story, acting, animation, and effects combining animation with the live-action footage; however, the soundtrack and visuals received praise. The film was also a box office bomb, grossing $14 million against a budget of $28 million.

Despite appearing on several lists of the worst films ever made, Cool World developed a cult following and has been described as a cult classic.

Plot

In 1945 Las Vegas, World War II veteran Frank Harris returns to his mother and invites her to a ride on his motorcycle. The two are involved in a traffic collision where Frank's mother dies. Afterwards, Frank is inadvertently transported to a cartoon-like alternate universe called the "Cool World", where he restarts his life as a detective for Cool World's local police department.

Forty-seven years later, underground cartoonist Jack Deebs is being released from a ten-year prison sentence for the murder of a man he found in bed with his wife. During his sentence, he created a series of comics called Cool World based on recurring visions of his, prominently featuring femme fatale Holli Would. Holli's wish is to escape Cool World and become a real person, which is possible when "doodles" (slang for Cool World's inhabitants) have sexual intercourse with "noids" (slang for humans). However, Frank and his partner Nails, a doodle, keep a vigilant eye on Holli to ensure that the two dimensions do not intertwine.

Shortly after his release, Jack is transported into Cool World and smuggled into a local nightclub by Holli and her henchmen. Frank aggressively confronts Jack, explaining that Cool World has existed long before he created his series. He also warns him that writing utensils, such as his fountain pen, are lethal to the doodles; and to abstain from having sex with Holli, as her transforming into a noid can be dangerous for both dimensions. Despite these warnings, Frank himself is in love with another doodle, Lonette, but limits himself to platonic advances. Jack succumbs to Holli's advances, and she makes love to him, which transforms her into a noid. Holli steals Jack's pen to entrap Nails, and leaves with Jack for the real world.

In the real world, Holli finds herself excited and overwhelmed experiencing real sensations. Due to her presence there, she and Jack spontaneously flicker in between noid and doodle forms. While contemplating their situation, Holli tells Jack about the "Spike of Power", an artifact which was the cause of Frank being transported into Cool World and placed on top of the Union Plaza Hotel by a doodle who crossed into the real world, and admits she wants to use it to remain in her noid form permanently. When Jack displays skepticism about the idea, Holli abandons him to search for the spike on her own.

Frank learns what has happened and returns to the real world, where he reluctantly teams up with Jack in a bid to stop Holli despite hostility between one another. They arrive at the hotel as Holli begins to climb to the top of the tower. In his pursuit, Frank is pushed off the building to his death by Holli. As she seizes the spike, she releases a multitude of monstrous doodles into the real world, affecting her surroundings. The Spike also transforms Jack into a superhero-like doodle, and in the ensuing chaos, frees Nails from the pen.

Although enticed to ignore and begin a new life in the real world with Holli, Jack returns the Spike to its rightful place, sending him, Holli and the invading doodles back from whence the creatures came and restoring the balance between their dimensions. Nails brings Frank's body back to Cool World, where he and Lonette mourn his loss. However, as she finds out from Nails that Holli was briefly in her doodle form when she killed Frank, she explains that a noid killed by a doodle in the real world can be reborn as a doodle in Cool World. Frank is transformed into a doodle, allowing him to continue his relationship with Lonette. Jack and Holli, permanently in doodle form, are last seen as Jack begins planning their new life together, much to Holli's dismay.

Cast
 Kim Basinger as Holli Would, a femme fatale doodle who wishes to become a noid and live in the real world. Basinger also voices Holli in her doodle form.
 Gabriel Byrne as Jack Deebs, an ex-convict cartoonist who is seemingly responsible for the creation of Cool World.
 Brad Pitt as Frank Harris, a former World War II veteran-turned-detective for Cool World's police department who is intent on stopping Holli. Pitt also voices Frank in his doodle form.
 Deirdre O'Connell as Isabelle Malley, a neighbor of Jack.
 Michele Abrams as Jennifer Malley
 Janni Brenn-Lowen as Agatha Rose Harris
 Frank Sinatra Jr. as himself

Voices
 Charlie Adler as Nails, a spider-like doodle and Frank's partner.
 Joey Camen as Slash, a diminutive primate-like doodle and one of Holli's "Goons".
 Camen also voices the sentient door of Holli's apartment building (credited as "Holli's Door") and one of the doodle interrogators Frank meets when he first enters Cool World (credited as "Interrogator No. 1")
 Michael Lally as Sparks, a doodle criminal who works as an informant for Cool World's police department.
 Maurice LaMarche as Doctor Vincent "Vegas Vinnie" Whiskers, a kind, wise and eccentric doodle scientist who inadvertently transported Frank to Cool World through his usage of the Spike of Power.
 LaMarche also voices Mash, a massive bestial doodle and one of Holli's "Goons"; Jack in his doodle form (credited as "Super Jack"); a drunk patron at the Slash Club (credited as "Drunk Bar Patron"); and one of the doodle interrogators Frank meets when he first enters Cool World (credited as "Interrogator No. 2")
 Candi Milo as Lonette, Frank's doodle love interest.
 Milo also voices Bob, a cross-dressing doodle and one of Holli's "Goons".
 Gregory Snegoff as Bash, a lanky doodle and one of Holli's "Goons".
 Patrick Pinney as Chico, a legless doodle who works as a bouncer at the Slash Club and literally bounces.
 Jenine Jennings as Craps Bunny, a rabbit-like doddle who plays craps with the Goons. His name is most likely a reference to Bugs Bunny.

Production

Development
Following a career resurgence with Mighty Mouse: The New Adventures in the late 1980s, in 1990, Ralph Bakshi concepted a new film project involving a cartoonist who created a comic book while in prison that makes him an underground "star". The cartoonist would go on to have sexual intercourse with a femme fatale "doodle" named "Debbie Dallas (a play on the title of the pornographic film, Debbie Does Dallas)" and father a hybrid child with her; half-cartoon, and half-human. The child, growing up resenting its father for abandoning it, would grow up and go on to make a pilgrimage to the real world to try to hunt down its father and kill him. Ralph pitched the idea as an live-action/animated horror film to Paramount Pictures, where he had served as the final head of the studio's animation division some years earlier. Bakshi stated that Paramount Pictures "bought the idea in ten seconds." In addition to Bakshi himself writing his own screenplay going off of his concept, Michael Grais and Mark Victor, along with an uncredited Larry Gross wrote several drafts of the screenplay based on Bakshi's original concept. Grais has accused Bakshi of lying about his contribution, noting he and Victor won repeated arbitrations regarding their credits. Producer Frank Mancuso Jr. — son of Paramount president Frank Mancuso Sr. — became attached as producer, leading Paramount to greenlight the film in November 1990. A long-running rumor attached to the film is that when Bakshi discovered that his original concept had been re-written behind his back without his knowledge or permission, he got into a physical altercation with Frank Mancuso Jr. that involved him punching the producer in the mouth. However, in a 2022 phone interview with Kevin E. G. Perry of The Independent, Bakshi put that rumor to rest, saying, "I never punched Frank Mancuso Jr. [...] That was just a rumour. I yelled at him a couple of times, but that wasn't his fault. I like Frank. I never punched him. Can you set that straight?"

Casting and production
Bakshi had originally intended to cast Pitt and Drew Barrymore in the film's leading roles. Instead, the studio insisted on casting bigger box office draws, leading to Basinger and Byrne being cast in late January 1991. The role of Frank was created for Pitt. Principal photography lasted from March 15 to April 19, 1991, with scenes being filmed both in Las Vegas and at soundstages at Paramount in Los Angeles.

The relationship between Bakshi and Paramount quickly deteriorated during production. Mancuso convinced Paramount that the film's potential R rating from the MPAA in the United States, which would restrict attendance from anyone under 17 without a parent or guardian, would be too risky. Hence why Mancuso hired Larry Gross to revise the screenplay to target a more general PG-13 MPAA rating, and presented it on the first day of production. Bakshi stated he felt "backstabbed" by Mancuso. Bakshi also claimed Basinger had approached him and Mancuso during production to rewrite the film herself because she "thought it would be great [...] if she would be able to show this picture in hospitals to sick children [...] I said, 'Kim, I think that's wonderful, but you've got the wrong guy to do that with.'"

Animation style
Bakshi's animation was done on the Paramount lot. The film's animators were never given a screenplay, instead told by Bakshi to "do a scene that's funny, whatever you want to do!"

The visual design of the live-action footage was intended to look like "a living, walk-through painting," a visual concept Bakshi had long wanted to achieve. The film's sets were based upon enlargements of designer Barry Jackson's paintings. The animation was strongly influenced by Fleischer Studios (whose cartoons were released by Paramount in the 1930s and 1940s) and Terrytoons (where Bakshi once worked, and whose Mighty Mouse character was also adapted into a series by Bakshi). The artwork by the character Jack Deebs was drawn by underground comix artist Spain Rodriguez.

Soundtrack
A soundtrack album, Songs from the Cool World, featuring recordings by My Life with the Thrill Kill Kult, Moby, Ministry, The Future Sound of London, and others, was released in 1992 by Warner Bros. Records. It included the track "Real Cool World" by David Bowie, his first original solo material in roughly three years; the song was written exclusively for the film. The soundtrack received stronger reviews from critics than the film itself, including a four-star rating from AllMusic. Mark Isham's original score for Cool World, featuring a mixture of jazz, orchestral pieces, and electronic remixes, and performed by the Munich Symphony Orchestra, was released on compact disc by Varèse Sarabande, and in complete form in 2015 by Quartet. It also received positive reviews.

Promotion
Paramount focused the film's promotion both on being as Bakshi's comeback, and the hypersexual imagery of Holli Would. It was considered by some experts as misaimed. Paramount's marketing president Barry London noted the film "unfortunately did not seem to satisfy the younger audience it was aimed at." Designer Milton Knight recalled that premiere audiences "actually wanted a wilder, raunchier Cool World."

Several different licensed video games based on the film were created by Ocean Software. The first game was developed by Twilight and released in 1992 for the Amiga, Atari ST, Commodore 64, and DOS. Two different games were released in 1993 for the Nintendo Entertainment System and Super NES, alongside a Game Boy version of the former. A four-issue comic book prequel to the film was published as a miniseries by DC Comics. It featured a script by Michael Eury and art work by Stephen DeStefano, Chuck Fiala, and Bill Wray.

Controversy
The studio's request was initially denied by the City of Los Angeles, but reversed once Paramount gave $27,000 to the city, and an additional $27,000 for cleanup after the 1992 Los Angeles riots. Local residents were angered by the sign's alteration, largely due to the sexualized image of Holli, and launched a failed lawsuit against the city to stop the alteration. In a letter to the city's Recreation and Park Board, commission officials wrote that they were "appalled" by the board's approval of the alterations: "...the action your board has taken is offensive to Los Angeles women and is not within your role as custodian and guardian of the Hollywood sign. The fact that Paramount Pictures donated a mere $27,000 to Rebuild L.A. should not be a passport to exploit women in Los Angeles." Protestors picketed the unveiling of the altered sign.

Reception

Box office
Cool World opened sixth at the North American box office, with $5.5 million. Although set to expand to more theaters in its second weekend, Paramount stunned exhibitors by immediately ceasing advertising for the film. Its lifetime gross was US$14.1 million, barely more than half its reported US$28 million budget.

Critical response

The consensus reads: "Cool World throws a small handful of visual sparks, but they aren't enough to distract from the screenplay's thin characters and scattered plot." On Metacritic the film has a score of 28 based on reviews from 16 critics, indicating "generally unfavorable reviews". Audiences surveyed by CinemaScore gave the film a grade of "C" on scale of A+ to F.

Variety reviewer Brian Lowry compared the film to an extended music video, praising the soundtrack and visuals, but panning the story. The plot was heavily derided by other reviewers, with a review for the Los Angeles Times saying "[T]he plot makes almost no sense." 

Roger Ebert of the wrote for the Chicago Sun-Times that the film "misses one opportunity after another ... [it is] a surprisingly incompetent film." Leonard Maltin panned the film as "too serious to be fun, too goofy to take seriously; lead characters unlikable and unappealing. Looks like a Roger Corman version of Roger Rabbit." Chris Hicks for Deseret News  described it as "a one-joke movie – and it's a dirty joke. [...] And much of what's going on here seems more angry and nasty than inspired or funny." The film's acting and effects were singled out by The Washington Post reviewer Hal Hinson, who wrote her performance made him wonder "whether Kim Basinger is more obnoxious as a cartoon or as a real person", and felt that the combination of animation and live action was unconvincing.

In 1997, John Grant wrote in The Encyclopedia of Fantasy that Cool World "stands as one of the fantastic cinema's most significant achievements, an 'Instauration fantasy' that reveals greater depths with each viewing." In 2005, animation historian Jerry Beck described the film as being "for adults and Bakshi completists only". He wrote the film "has a great premise, a great cast, and the best animation he's ever been involved with", but critiquing it as a "pointless rehash of many of Ralph's favorite themes, and the story literally goes nowhere".

In some interviews after the release of the film, Bakshi denounced the film, saying "I thought if I did the animation well, it would be worth it, but you know what? It wasn't worth it." Bakshi also stated that he "had a lot of animators there that I'd brought in and I thought that maybe I could just have fun animating this stuff, which I did." In 2022 he stated "I used to disparage it, but not anymore" and that "Cool World has some of the best animation I've ever done."

The film garnered a Razzie Award nomination for Kim Basinger as Worst Actress.

See also
 List of adult animated films
 List of films considered the worst
 List of films set in Las Vegas

References

External links

 
 
 
 
 
 Cool World  at the official Ralph Bakshi website.

1992 films
1992 animated films
1992 comedy films
1990s American animated films
1990s black comedy films
1990s English-language films
1990s fantasy comedy films
American films with live action and animation
American animated fantasy films
American adult animated films
American black comedy films
American fantasy comedy films
Adult animated comedy films
Films about fictional painters
Films about parallel universes
Films about comics
Films adapted into comics
Films directed by Ralph Bakshi
Films scored by Mark Isham
Films set in 1945
Films set in 1992
Films set in the Las Vegas Valley
Films shot in the Las Vegas Valley
Films shot in Los Angeles
Films with screenplays by Michael Grais
Films with screenplays by Mark Victor
Paramount Pictures animated films
Paramount Pictures films
Rotoscoped films